David Joshua Paulson (born February 22, 1989) is a former American football tight end. He was selected in the seventh round, 240th overall, by the Steelers in the 2012 NFL Draft. He played college football at Oregon.

Professional career

Pittsburgh Steelers
Paulson was released by the Steelers on August 30, 2014 for final roster cuts before the start of the 2014 season.

San Diego Chargers
On November 27, 2014, Paulson was signed to the practice squad of the San Diego Chargers.

References

External links
 
 Oregon Ducks bio

1989 births
Living people
American football tight ends
Oregon Ducks football players
People from Auburn, Washington
Pittsburgh Steelers players
Players of American football from Washington (state)
Sportspeople from King County, Washington